St. Anne's is a station on the Port Authority of Allegheny County's light rail network, located in Castle Shannon, Pennsylvania. Unlike every other small, street level stop along the network, St. Anne's features a parking lot. 130 spaces are available to commuters, and the station is also within walking distance of many area residences. While most street level stops are named for the nearest intersecting road, this station bears the name of St. Anne's Catholic School, from which the Port Authority leases the parking facility.

References

External links 
Port Authority T Stations Listings
Station from Spring Street from Google Maps Street View

Port Authority of Allegheny County stations
Transportation buildings and structures in Allegheny County, Pennsylvania
Railway stations in the United States opened in 1984